The city of Billings, Montana is subdivided into 11 sections for geographic and planning purposes.

Downtown Core 

This is the main financial, business, cultural and medical area of Billings and the surrounding areas and is home to several high-rise buildings including Montana's tallest high-rise, the First Interstate Center.

Neighborhoods in this section:
East Downtown
Historic District
Fairgrounds

West Downtown
China Alley
Medical Corridor
Cathedral District
Civic District
MSU-Billings
Bottom Westend Historic District

North Side
North Park
Dehler Park 

South Side
Old Town
South Park

Phillips (Named after the Phillips 66 Refinery)
Refinery

Heights 
Located Northeast of the Downtown Core, was annexed into the city in the mid 1980s.  This area is where the Lake Hills Golf Course.

Neighborhoods in this section:
East Heights
Bench
West Heights
Lake Hills
Moon Valley

Northeast 
Northeast is bordered by Roundup Road, Mary Street, Dury Lane and the Yellowstone River. Located northeast of the Heights.

North Elevation 
This area is where the Rimrocks rise up above the Yellowstone Valley.

Neighborhoods in this section:
BIL-Airport
Zimmerman
Rehberg Ranch
Indian Cliffs

Terry 
This area is where Central and Terry parks are located. Also where Billings Central Catholic High School is located.

Neighborhoods in this section:
Terry Park
Central Park
Highlands Country Club
Rocky Mountain College
College Streets
Tree Streets
Poet Streets

West End 
Widely known as the West End or West Side, this is one of the fastest-growing areas in Billings. The West End is the home of Rimrock Mall and Billings West High School, the home of the Bears. The local middle school is Will James, and Meadowlark Elementary is for K-6 graders.

Neighborhoods in this section:
Mid-town
Overland Business Park
Gorham Park
Central Heights
Olympic Park
TransTech Center
Southgate Business park
The Industrial Sites
Wilshire Heights
Lillis Heights
West Ridge

Southwest 
It will soon be the location for a new retail/commercial development called Billings Town Square in which Cabelas will be the anchor tenant.

Neighborhoods in this section:
South Hills
Riverfront
Briarwood
Josephine Crossing
Southwest Subdivision
Blue Creek
Duck Creek

South Central

Northwest 
This area typically encompasses the area north of Grand Avenue and west of Shiloh. This area tends to be the more affluent part of town.

Neighborhoods in this section:
Yellowstone Country Club
Augusta Ranch
Copper Ridge
Mount Vista
Falcon Ridge
Ironwood

Shiloh 
It is located to the west of the West End - Descro area, and is centered around Shiloh Road, a north-south arterial which in 2008 underwent a major widening project that included the addition of 7 roundabouts. Near the southern part of this section of Billings, south of King Avenue West, a shopping district called Shiloh Crossing was built around the same time, consisting of a movie theater and various restaurants, shops and department stores including Kohl's.

Neighborhoods in this section:
North Shiloh
Vintage Estates
Grand Peaks
Cloverleaf Meadows
Shiloh Point
Rush Subdivision
Fox Tail Village    
South Shiloh
Shiloh Industrial Park

Outlying North
This area is located north of the Airport and west of the Heights and is where the Inner Belt Loop is proposed to link the West End to the Heights.

Neighborhoods in this section:
Alkali Creek

Lockwood
Lockwood is a Billings suburb located to the east with access to I90. Lockwood has grown to become the largest unincorporated community in the state of Montana and the 16th largest population center in the state. This area is where the Billings Bypass will join the Lockwood area to the Heights via a new interchange on I90.

Shepherd
Shepherd is a Billings suburb located to the northeast off of highway 312. The unincorporated town was named after R.E. Shepherd, a prominent early settler and owner of the Billings Land and Irrigation Company and the Merchants National Bank.

Billings, Montana